The Chicago, Milwaukee, St. Paul and Pacific Railroad Depot was built by the Chicago, Milwaukee, St. Paul and Pacific Railroad (also known as The Milwaukee Road) in 1906. It is located at the south end of the business district in Madison, South Dakota. The building is a rectangular single-story brick structure. It housed men's and women's waiting rooms, a lunch room ("beanery"), station agent's office, and a freight room. Rather than being a wood-frame building, as was usual for smaller, rural stations, the depot at Madison was built of brick.

The Milwaukee Road first entered Madison in the 1881. In 1906 it built the new depot. It functioned as a passenger station until 1953. The building was still used by the railroad as offices and a freight agency. In 1979, before The Milwaukee Road went bankrupt, the depot was closed. After the bankruptcy, the BNSF Railway bought the property and the rail line. It continued to use the depot for freight and storage until 1981. BNSF then closed the depot for good. In 1989, the depot was bought by local citizens who then turned it over to the local Chamber of Commerce for use as its new office.

The depot was listed in the National Register of Historic Places because of its architecture and also because of its association with the development of Madison.

References

Weiland, Ted, and John Rau. Chicago, Milwaukee, St. Paul, and Pacific Railroad Depot at Madison National Register of Historic Places Registration Form, National Park Service, Washington, DC, 1989.

Railway stations on the National Register of Historic Places in South Dakota
Madison, South Dakota
Railway stations in the United States opened in 1906
Transportation in Lake County, South Dakota
National Register of Historic Places in Lake County, South Dakota
Railway stations closed in 1953
Former railway stations in South Dakota